Bear River Dam (National ID # CA00379, also known as the Upper Bear River Dam) is a dam in Amador County, California, due east of Sacramento.

It impounds the Bear River for hydroelectric power generation and municipal water supply. It is owned and operated by Pacific Gas and Electric Company, the largest private owner of hydroelectric facilities in the United States, making it one of the company's 174 dams.

Recreation includes fishing, swimming, and camping, however the Upper Bear River Reservoir can only be accessed by foot, and is mostly unused by the public.

The Lower Bear River Reservoir and its own dam lie immediately downstream and to the west, also owned by PG&E.

The dam is being examined as the upper pool in a 380-1,140 MW pumped-storage project with the Salt Springs Reservoir as the lower pool.

See also 
List of dams and reservoirs in California
List of lakes in California

References 

Buildings and structures in Amador County, California
Dams completed in 1900
Dams in California
Pacific Gas and Electric Company dams
Reservoirs in Amador County, California
Rock-filled dams
Reservoirs in California
Reservoirs in Northern California